Zlatina Atanasova Dimitrova (Златина Атанасова Димитрова , born  in Burgas) is a Bulgarian weightlifter, competing in the 69 kg category and representing Bulgaria at international competitions. 

She participated at the 2004 Summer Olympics in the 58 kg event.

Major results

References

External links
 
http://www.iwf.net/results/athletes/?athlete=atanasova-zlatina-1980-06-05&id=391&printpage=1
http://www.nzherald.co.nz/sport/news/article.cfm?c_id=4&objectid=3584880
http://www.alamy.com/stock-photo-zlatina-atanasova-bulgaria-athens-greece-16-august-2004-127102474.html

1980 births
Living people
Bulgarian female weightlifters
Weightlifters at the 2004 Summer Olympics
Olympic weightlifters of Bulgaria
Sportspeople from Burgas
20th-century Bulgarian women
21st-century Bulgarian women